Samuel E. Sebo (1906 – December 10, 1933) was an American football fullback who played one season with the Newark Tornadoes of the National Football League (NFL). He played college football at Syracuse University and attended Garfield High School in Garfield, New Jersey.

References

External links
Just Sports Stats

1906 births
1933 deaths
American football fullbacks
Garfield High School (New Jersey) alumni
Syracuse Orange football players
Newark Tornadoes players
Players of American football from New Jersey
People from Garfield, New Jersey
Sportspeople from Bergen County, New Jersey